Hacia Dos Veranos (Towards Two Summers in English) is an Argentinian post-rock band born in 2005 as a project of two friends who moved to Buenos Aires to study.
The band released in August 2005 an EP called Fragmentos De Una Tarde Somnolienta ("Fragments From a Sleepy Afternoon") which was released in Argentina by MuyModerna Records and in England in February 2006 by I Wish I Was Unpopular Records.
In May 2007 they released their first full-length album called De Los Valles y Volcanes ("Of Valleys and Volcanoes") under Scatter Records in Argentina and Discos de la Bahía in Spain. In July 2010 their self-titled second album was made available to the public at the band's Bandcamp page.

The name of the band is based on the book Tropic Of Cancer by Henry Miller and like they stated: "Summer is the season that better memories give us, going into two summers it's like going in search for happiness".

 Discography 

 Studio albums 
Hacia Dos Veranos (2010)
De Los Valles y Volcanes (2007)

EPs
Fragmentos De Una Tarde Somnolienta (EP) (2005)

 Compilations It's the Taking Part that Counts (wiaiwya, UK, 2012): Features the song The Way of the Hand and the Foot.Hangover Lounge EP 1 (Hangover Lounge, UK, 2010): Features the song The Cat & Cucumber.Porque este océano es el tuyo, es el mío ( Si no puedo bailar, no es mi revolución, Brazil, 2007): Features the song Despertar.Let it bee (My Honey Records, Italy, 2007): Features the song La última tarde del apicultor.25 Canciones para escuchar mientras te haces una tostada (Argentina, 2007): Features the song Despertar.Granada Vol 2 (Molecula Records, Mexico, 2006): Features the song Despertar.Canciones pegajosas (ZonaIndie, Argentina, 2005): Features the song Despertar.There goes winter (Kidart, Argentina, 2005): Features the song Preludio.

 Members 

 Hacia Dos Veranos Ignacio Aguiló: guitarDiego Martínez: bass, keyboardsDiego Acosta: guitar, keyboardsJulia Bayse: flute, keyboardsPatricio Dellariva (2009-), Andrés Edelstein (2006-8), Sebastián Henderson (2005-6): drumsEzequiel Llorente (2009-)': guitar

References

External links 
Official Website
Hacia Dos Veranos' MySpace
Scatter Records
I Wish I Was Unpopular Records

Argentine indie rock groups
Musical groups established in 2005
Argentine post-rock groups
Musical groups from Buenos Aires